Charles-Jérémie Coulombe (October 23, 1846 – December 1, 1938) was a physician and political figure in Quebec. He represented Maskinongé in the House of Commons of Canada from 1887 to 1891 as a Conservative member.

He was born in St-Cuthbert, Canada East, and educated at the college in L'Assomption. In 1879, he married Marie Noémi Bernier. He served as a major in the militia. Coulombe was an unsuccessful candidate for a seat in the House of Commons in 1884. His attempts at reelection in 1891 and 1896 were unsuccessful.

References 

The Canadian parliamentary companion, 1887 AJ Gemmill

1846 births
1937 deaths
Members of the House of Commons of Canada from Quebec
Conservative Party of Canada (1867–1942) MPs